D.C. Everest Idea School is a student-directed, project-based charter school in the D.C. Everest School District, Weston, Wisconsin, United States.

History
In 2011, four teachers in the D.C. Everest School District signed a charter to create a school based around their ideas of teaching. The original idea of the school was to have a "self-directed environment" to create the "next generation of leaders and workers". They came up with a project-based learning method, with students completing mainly independent projects to gain credit.

References

Charter schools in Wisconsin
Schools in Marathon County, Wisconsin